The 1922 Chattanooga Moccasins football team represented the University of Chattanooga, located in the American city of Chattanooga, Tennessee and today known as the University of Tennessee at Chattanooga, in the sport of gridiron football for the 1922 college football season. The team was a member of the Southern Intercollegiate Athletic Association and completed its 9-game schedule with a record of 6 wins, 2 losses, and 1 tie. It was led by head coach Bill McAllester, in his first season at the helm of the Moccasins.

Schedule

References

Chattanooga
Chattanooga Mocs football seasons
Chattanooga Moccasins football